Maksim Paskotši (born 19 January 2003) is an Estonian professional footballer who plays as a centre-back for Premier League club Tottenham Hotspur and the Estonia national team.

Club career
Paskotši made his senior debut for FC Flora on the 20 June 2020, starting as a central defender in the 4–2 cup victory against FC Elva. He joined English club Tottenham Hotspur for an undisclosed fee on 21 September 2020.

On 19 August 2021, Paskotši made his debut for Tottenham by coming on as a substitute in the inaugural UEFA Europa Conference League competition against Paços de Ferreira, which ended in a 1–0 defeat.

International career 
Paskotši made his international debut for Estonia on 24 March 2021 in a 2022 FIFA World Cup qualification match against the Czech Republic. He was part of the Estonian side that won the 2020 Baltic Cup (played in 2021 due to restrictions caused by the COVID-19 pandemic).

Career statistics

Club

International

Honours
Estonia
Baltic Cup: 2020

References

External links
 
 
 

2003 births
Living people
Footballers from Tallinn
Estonian footballers
Estonian expatriate footballers
Estonian expatriate sportspeople in England
Expatriate footballers in England
Estonia youth international footballers
Estonia international footballers
Association football central defenders
FC Flora players
Tottenham Hotspur F.C. players
Meistriliiga players
Esiliiga players